Alisal Union Elementary School District  is a public school district based in Monterey County, California, United States.

The Alisal Union Elementary School District has 12 schools in Salinas, California. 

 Alisal Community School, 1437 Del Monte Avenue
 Bardin Elementary School, 425 Bardin Road
 Cesar E. Chavez Elementary School, 1225 Towt Street
 Creekside Elementary School, 1770 Kittery Street
 Dr. Oscar F. Loya Elementary School, 1505 Cougar Drive
 Frank Paul Elementary School, 1300 Rider Avenue
 Fremont Elementary School, 1255 East Market Street
 Jesse G. Sanchez School, 901 N. Sanborn Road
 John E. Steinbeck Elementary School, 1714 Burlington Drive
 Martin Luther King Jr. Academy, 925 North Sanborn Road
 Monte Bella Elementary School, 1300 Tuscany Blvd
 Virginia Rocca Barton School, 680 Las Casitas Drive

In June 1937, bids were made at the office of the architect for the school, C. J. Ryland, to build four new classrooms and a teachers' room for the Alisal Union Elementary School building. The work was completed by November 1937.

References

External links
 

School districts in Monterey County, California